Railroad Creek is a stream in the U.S. state of Washington. It flows into Lake Chelan in the unincorporated community of Lucerne.

Railroad Creek was so named on account it was proposed a railroad should be built near its course, however this project did not materialize.
The 1946 MGM film, Courage of Lassie was shot on location here, near Holden.

See also
List of rivers of Washington

References

Rivers of Chelan County, Washington
Rivers of Washington (state)